Kings Head, Nova Scotia is a headland at the end of Melmerby Beach Provincial Park in the Canadian province of Nova Scotia, located in Pictou County. It was the site of a lighthouse of wooden construction marking the entrance to Merigomish Harbour 31. The light is no longer operational but the base building is now a private residence accessed by Levi White Road.

References
Alma on Destination Nova Scotia

Communities in Pictou County
General Service Areas in Nova Scotia
Headlands of Nova Scotia